Mickey's Safari in Letterland is a 1993 educational Nintendo Entertainment System video game starring the famous cartoon character Mickey Mouse. In this game, Mickey must collect all of the letters of the alphabet for his museum by going to six different territories (including places inspired by the Yukon and the Caribbean). There are three levels of difficulty.

Enemies in the game include snakes, porcupines and alligators. However, players cannot die from these enemies - they are simply bounced of them. Using a digitized audio sample of each of the letter, Mickey spells with letters using his own voice.

This video game is intended for preschoolers and toddlers. Basic literacy skills are taught in this side-scrolling video game.

See also
List of Disney video games

References

1993 video games
Children's educational video games
Hi Tech Expressions games
Mickey Mouse video games
Nintendo Entertainment System games
Nintendo Entertainment System-only games
North America-exclusive video games
Platform games
Video games developed in Australia
Single-player video games